Mauro de Pretis (died 1533) was a Roman Catholic prelate who served as Bishop of Telese o Cerreto Sannita (1525–1533).

Biography
On 6 October 1525, Mauro de Pretis was appointed during the papacy of Pope Clement VII as Bishop of Telese o Cerreto Sannita.
He served as Bishop of Telese o Cerreto Sannita until his death in 1533.

References

External links and additional sources
 (Chronology of Bishops) 
 (Chronology of Bishops) 

16th-century Italian Roman Catholic bishops
Bishops appointed by Pope Clement VII
1533 deaths